Each to His Own Way is a 1948 Swedish film directed by Hasse Ekman.

Cast
Gunn Wållgren - Birgit, actress
Hasse Ekman - Tage Sundell, doctor
Uno Henning - Birger Holmberg, doctor
Marianne Aminoff - Sonja Collin
Stig Järrel - Nils Brenner, actor
Gunnar Björnstrand - Sture Widman
Eva Dahlbeck - Karin Brofeldt, actress
Åke Grönberg - Gösta Sund, doctor
Gösta Cederlund - Hellsten, professor 
Hilda Borgström - Mrs. Lundkvist
Björn Berglund - Bengt Carlgren, doctor
Tord Stål - the gynecologist 
Gull Natorp - Gabriella Collin, Sonjas mother
Hugo Jacobson - Hjalmar Collin, Sonjas father
Karl-Arne Holmsten - doctor
Stig Olin - Fredrik Salén
Willy Peters - Cetrén

External links

1948 films
Films directed by Hasse Ekman
1940s Swedish-language films
Swedish drama films
1948 drama films
Swedish black-and-white films
1940s Swedish films